Ronald Bennett may refer to:

Ronald Bennett (priest) (born 1935), Irish Franciscan friar and sports master who was convicted of sexual assault against some of his pupils
Ronald Bennett (athlete) (born 1984), Honduran athlete